Kullu Dussehra is the renowned International Mega Dussehra festival observed in the month of October in Himachal Pradesh state in northern India. Wherein more than 4-5 lakh(400,000-500,000) people visit the fair from all across the Globe. It is celebrated in the Dhalpur maidan in the Kullu valley. Dussehra at Kullu commences on the tenth day of the rising moon, i.e. on 'Vijay Dashmi' day itself and continues for seven days. Its history dates back to the 17th century when local King Jagat Singh installed an idol of Raghunath on his throne as a mark of penance. After this, god Raghunath was declared as the ruling deity of the Valley. The State government has accorded the status of International festival to the Kullu Dussehra, which attracts tourists in large numbers.

History of kullu dussehra
According legend, after this return from a pilgrimage to Maharishi Jamdagni went to his hermitage at Malana. On his head he carried a basket filled with eighteen images of different gods. Crossing through Chanderkhani pass, he came upon a fierce storm. Struggling to stay on his feet, Maharishi Jamdagni's basket was thrown from his head, scattering the images to many distant places. Hill people, finding these images saw them take shape or form as Gods, and began to worship them. Legend has it that deity worship began in the Kullu Valley.

Raja Jagat Singh ruled over the prosperous and beautiful kingdom of Kullu. As the ruler, the Raja learned of a peasant by the name of Durgadatta who apparently possessed many beautiful pearls. The Raja thought he should have these treasured pearls, even though the only pearls Durgadatta had were pearls of Knowledge. But the Raja in his greed ordered Durgadatta to hand over his pearls or be hanged. Knowing of his inevitable fate at the hands of the king, Durgadatta threw himself on the fire and cursed the king, "Whenever you eat, your rice will appear as worms, and water will appear as blood". Doomed by his fate, the Raja sought solace and searched out advice from a Brahmin. The Holy man told him that in order to eradicate the curse, he must retrieve the deity of Ragunath from Ram's kingdom. Desperate, the king sent a Brahmin to Ayodya. Later the Brahmin stole the deity and set out on his journey back to Kullu. The people of Ayodya, finding their beloved Ragunath missing, set out in search of the Kullu Brahmin. On the banks of the Saryu river, they approached the Brahmin and asked him why he had taken Ragunath ji. The Brahmin recounted the story of the Kullu king. The people of Ayodya attempted to lift Ragunath, but their deity became incredibly heavy when headed back towards Ayodya, and became very light when headed to Kullu. On reaching Kullu Ragunath was installed as the reigning deity of the Kullu kingdom. After installing the deity of Ragunath, Raja Jagat Singh drank the Charan-Amrit of the deity and the curse was lifted. Jagat Singh became Lord Ragunath's regent. This legend is connected with the Dussehra at Kullu. This deity is taken in a Ratha to the Dussehra.It started in 1606 and continues till now.

References

External links
 kulludussehra.hp.gov.in
 Kullu Dussehra

Festivals in Himachal Pradesh
Kullu